Hannibal (247–183/182 BC) was a Carthaginian general who fought the Roman Republic in the Second Punic War.

Hannibal may also refer to:

Names
 Hannibal (given name)
 Hannibal (surname)

Film and television
 Hannibal (1959 film), a film based on the life on the Carthaginian general
 Hannibal, a 1972 film by Xavier Koller
 Hannibal (2001 film), a film based on Thomas Harris' novel, starring Anthony Hopkins
 Hannibal (2006 TV film), a BBC TV film starring Alexander Siddig
 Hannibal (TV series), a 2013 NBC TV drama series
 Hannibal, a meerkat in Meerkat Manor

Games
 Hannibal (video game), a 1994 PC/DOS computer game
Hannibal: Rome vs. Carthage, a 1996 Avalon Hill board game

Literature
 Hannibal (Harris novel), a novel by Thomas Harris and featuring Hannibal Lecter
 Hannibal (Leckie novel), a 1995 historical novel by Ross Leckie
 Hannibal, a dog in Agatha Christie's novel Postern of Fate

Music
 Hannibal Records, a now-defunct record label
 "Hannibal", a track by Santana from Zebop!
 "Hannibal", a track by Miles Davis from Amandla
Hannibal, a fictional opera in The Phantom of the Opera

People
 Hannibal Gisco (c. 295–258 BC), Carthaginian military commander who fought the Roman Republic in the First Punic War
 Hannibal Lokumbe or Hannibal (born 1948), American jazz trumpeter and composer
 Hannibal, a ring name of Devon Nicholson (born 1982), Canadian professional wrestler
 Hannibal Mejbri (born 2003), Tunisian professional footballer

Places

United States
 Hannibal, Missouri, a city and hometown of Mark Twain
 Hannibal micropolitan area
 Hannibal Regional Airport
 Hannibal, New York, a town
 Hannibal (village), New York, a village contained within the town
 Hannibal, Ohio, a census-designated place
 Hannibal, Wisconsin, an unincorporated community

Elsewhere
 Hannibal Islands, Queensland, Australia
 2152 Hannibal, an asteroid

Ships
 , various ships and a shore establishment
 USS Hannibal (Ag-1), a converted steamer
 Hannibal (slave ship), a 17th-century slave-trading ship

Structures
 Hannibal (Dortmund), two multi-use high-rise buildings in Dortmund, Germany
 Hannibal Bridge, spanning the Missouri River
 Hannibal House, an office building in London

Other uses
 Hannibal (G.I. Joe), a clone of the Carthaginian general in the G.I. Joe universe
 Hannibal (horse) (1801–c. 1806), a Thoroughbred racehorse that won the 1804 Epsom Derby
 Hannibal (network), a network of far-right prepper groups in German-speaking countries
 Operation Hannibal, a Second World War German sea evacuation of soldiers and civilians ahead of the advancing Red Army
 Hannibal-TV, a privately owned television network in Tunisia
 G-AAGX Hannibal, a named Handley Page H.P.42 airliner

See also
 Aníbal (name), the Spanish equivalent
 Annibal (disambiguation)
 Annibale, the Italian equivalent of the given name
 Hanbal
 Hannibal Directive, a controversial secret Israel Defense Forces directive
 HMS Hannibal, a list of ships of the Royal Navy
 The Mighty Hannibal, stage name of American R&B singer James Shaw
 Torstenson War or Hannibal War, a conflict between Sweden and Denmark–Norway (1643–1645)